Monkey Business is a Czech funk band. It is one of the projects of its leader Roman Holý, the other being J.A.R..

History 
The group teamed up at the beginning of 1999. Singer Matěj Ruppert came from the group Leguar GR, Oldřich Krejčoves played in Pan Pot, Pavel Mrázek and Martin Houdek came from Dorota B.B. and Tonya Graves came from dance oriented Liquid Harmony. Their debut record, Why Be In When You Could Be Out, was released in 2000.  It includes such hit songs as Party Shit, My Friends, the slow Piece of my Life, and only one song sung in Czech (Hi & Stereo).

Members 
Matěj Ruppert - vocals
Tereza Černochová - vocals
Oldřich Krejčoves - guitar
Ondřej Brousek - keyboards
Roman Holý - keyboards, vocals
Pavel Mrázek - bass guitar
Martin Houdek - drums

Notable guests 
Percussionist Imran Musa Zangi is a regular guest. Other star guests featured on the band's records include Fred Wesley and David Williams (Why be in...). More guests followed on Save The Robots: Dr. Robert from The Blow Monkeys, Raymond Davis, Clarence Haskins, Dennis Chambers and Fred Wesley.
On Resistance Is Futile, the guest list was expanded even more with the likes of Hiram Bullock, Iva Bittová, Jiří Stivín, Roman Dragoun, Filip Jelínek, František Kop, Radka Kaspar, Jaroslav Halíř, František Tomšíček, Tomáš Křemenák, Nada Weppereová (vocals), Petr Dopita and Michael Fišer.

Kiss Me On My Ego features Hiram Bullock, David Sanborn and Glenn Hughes.
Freak Power singer Ashley Slater has supported some of 2008 Monkey Business live shows and as a guest vocal he appears (as same as Glenn Hughes again) on the Twilight of Jesters?.

Album Sex and Sport? Never! (2015) features Mike Stern and Gábor Presser.

Discography

Studio albums 
Why Be In When You Could Be Out (20)
Save the Robots (2001)
Resistance Is Futile (2003)
Kiss Me on My Ego (2005)
Objects of Desire And Other Complications (2007)
Twilight Of Jesters? (2009)
Sex and Sport? Never! (2015)
Bad Time for Gentlemen (2018)
Freedom On Sale (2020)

DVD 
 2004 - Lazy Youth Old Beggars
 2007 - Peeing With The Proletariat

Awards and nominations

Other awards in the Czech Republic:
2000 Rock & Pop Volby rocku - objev domácí
2001 Rock & Pop Volby rocku - skupina roku domácí

References

External links 

 Official site (Czech) 

Czech funk musical groups
Czech pop music groups
1999 establishments in the Czech Republic
Musical groups established in 1999